Patz or Pätz is a surname. Notable people with the surname include:

Alina Pätz (born 1990), Swiss curler
Arnall Patz (1920–2010), American medical doctor
Claudio Pätz (born 1987), Swiss curler
Etan Patz (1972–1979), murdered American child
Flemming Patz (born 1967), Swedish curler and coach
Johannes Patz (born 1993), Swedish curler
Jonathan Patz, American medical professor